Spoonful of Sugar is a 2022 horror thriller that was directed by Mercedes Bryce Morgan, based on a script written by Leah Saint Marie. The film centers on a college student who takes on a job caring for a sickly child, only for things to go horribly wrong when she offers him some of her own medication.

Synopsis 
Millicent is a college student who has taken some time away from school in order to take part in a treatment program that utilizes microdoses of LSD, which results in her experiencing occasional hallucinations. During this time she is also hired to care for Johnny, a sick and nonverbal young boy with allergies so severe that he must wear an astronaut-esque suit to keep him safe. She quickly discovers that the boy's home life is not perfect, as his father is prone to philandering while his mother is extremely intent on appearing as the perfect mother. Eventually Millicent decides to give Johnny some of her LSD, only to be met with horrifying results.

Cast 

 Morgan Saylor as Millicent
 Kat Foster as Rebecca
 Myko Olivier as Jacob
 Danilo Crovetti as Johnny
 Keith Powell as Dr. Welsh
 Laura Coover as Julia
 Shon Wilson as Esther
 Christiana Montoya as Little Girl

Release 
Spoonful of Sugar premiered on internet streaming service Shudder as one of its Shudder Originals on 2 March 2023. Prior to this the movie had been screened at several film festivals during 2022, including Fantastic Fest.

Reception 
Spoonful of Sugar currently holds a rating of 60% on Rotten Tomatoes, based on 10 reviews. CBR wrote a favorable review, noting that "Spoonful of Sugar is not going to be everyone's cup of tea, but for those who can handle some outrageous lunacy for about 90 minutes, this film will be a riot," and that Saylor "brilliantly conveys the character's mental state with surprising subtlety."  The Los Angeles Times's Noel Murray was more critical, as they felt "There’s not quite enough plot in “Spoonful of Sugar” to fill its running time, though the performances are so lively and director Morgan’s imagery so vivid that the picture is never dull. The film works best when it makes the least sense."

References

External links 

 

2022 horror thriller films
Shudder (streaming service) original programming